The Pacific motorcycle Grand Prix (パシフィックグランプリ) was a  round of the FIM Grand Prix motorcycle racing championship between 2000 and 2003.

Official names and sponsors 
2000–2001: Pacific Grand Prix of Motegi (no official sponsor)
2002–2003: Gauloises Pacific Grand Prix of MOTEGI

Winners of the Pacific Grand Prix

Multiple winners (riders)

Multiple winners (manufacturers)

By year

References

Sources

 
Motorsport competitions in Japan
Recurring sporting events established in 2000
Recurring sporting events disestablished in 2003
2000 establishments in Japan
2003 disestablishments in Japan